The Helsinki Air Show 2017 was an air show organized by the Finnish Aviation Museum on June 8, 2017, in Kaivopuisto, Helsinki, Finland. The show contained 17 performances. It was part of the 100th anniversary of the Finnish independence.

Programme
The programme of the show was as follows:

Gallery

References

Kaivopuisto
Air shows
Events in Helsinki
2010s in Helsinki
2017 in Finnish sport
2017 in air sports